HE0107-5240 is an extremely metal-poor Population II star, located roughly  away from Earth, that has a mass of approximately
80%  of the mass of the Sun. It is one of the most metal-poor stars known in our Galaxy, with a metallicity [Fe/H] = ; i.e. it has just  of the metal that the Sun has. Because of its very low metallicity, it is believed to be one of the earliest Population II stars to have formed. If so, then it is also very old, with an age of roughly 13 billion years. Because the star is not completely metal-free, it does not belong to the first generation of stars (the hypothetical Population III). These stars converted the pristine hydrogen, helium, and lithium formed by the Big Bang into heavier elements, such as carbon, oxygen, and metals.

The star is relatively small for a star of the early universe, which accounts for its old age: massive stars die quickly. To help explain why this star is so small, it is hypothesized it was once part of a binary star system.

HE0107-5240 was found by Norbert Christlieb and colleagues at the University of Hamburg in Germany as a byproduct of the Hamburg/ESO Survey for faint quasars with the 1m ESO Schmidt telescope. Follow-up observations were made at the Siding Spring 2.3 m Telescope and high-resolution spectra were taken at the European Southern Observatory in Chile, using one of the units of the Very Large Telescope. In 2005, a second star with an even smaller iron abundance, HE 1327-2326 ([Fe/H]=-5.4), was found, also in the Hamburg/ESO survey. In 2014 an even more metal poor star was announced: SMSS J031300.36−670839.3.

See also 
Ultra low metallicity / ultra metal poor stars
 Cayrel's Star
 HE 1327-2326
 SDSS J102915+172927

References 

 Christlieb N., Bessell M.S., Gustafsson B., Korn A., Barklem P.S., Karisson T., Mizuno-Wiedner M., Rossi S., "A stellar relic from the early Milky Way", Nature, 419, 904-906 (2002)

External links 
 SIMBAD-Entry (SIMBAD)
 Hamburg/ESO survey (Christlieb+, 2008)
 Relic Star Found, Pointing Way to Dawn of Time (Space.com)
 VLT UVES Observes Most Metal-Deficient Star Known (European Southern Observatory)
 he0107-5240

Phoenix (constellation)
Population II stars